Vashur (also Romanized as Vāshūr and Vashoor; also known as Bāchūr and Bāshūr) is a village in Kuhin Rural District, in the Central District of Kabudarahang County, Hamadan Province, Iran. At the 2006 census, its population was 608, in 117 families.

References 

Populated places in Kabudarahang County